Kawab is the name of an ancient Egyptian prince of the 4th Dynasty. He was the eldest son of King Khufu and  Queen Meritites I. Kawab served as vizier and was buried in the double mastaba G 7110–7120 in the east field which is part of the Giza Necropolis.

Biography

Kawab was the eldest son of Pharaoh Khufu and Meritites I and half-brother of pharaohs Djedefre and Khafre. He was possibly born during the reign of his grandfather Sneferu. Kawab married his sister Hetepheres II. They had at least three sons named Duaenhor, Kaemsekhem and  Mindjedef and a daughter Meresankh III.

Kawab died during the reign of his father so the next ruler was Djedefre, who married his widow Hetepheres II. It used to be believed that Djedefre had Kawab murdered, since Djedefre was buried in Abu Rawash, instead of Giza, which was the custom. Djedefre's pyramid was also vandalized, but it is now thought that the tomb was vandalized much later, that is, during Roman times.

Kawab's titles included officiant of Anubis, Priest of Serket, King's son of his body, King’s eldest son of his body, hereditary prince, chief of the ten(s) of Upper Egypt, sole companion of love, vizier (the title of vizier occurs on a statue from Mitrahina).

Titles 
The full list of titles of Kawab were:

Translations and indexes from Dilwyn Jones.

Tomb
Kawab was buried in a large double mastaba G 7110-7120 in the east field which is part of the Giza Necropolis. Mastaba G 7110 belonged to Kawab's wife. Her name was found in the chapel. G 7120 belonged to Kawab. A relief in the door way shows Kawab standing before his mother: 
zȝ.s mr.s kȝ-wˤb, zȝt nṯr.s ḫrp jmȝt sšmt mrt-jt.s mwt.f mst n ḫwfw
"Her son, her beloved, Ka-wab, the daughter of her god, she who is in charge of the affairs of the jmAt, Meritites, his mother, who bore (him) to Khufu." 

Four burial shafts were constructed as part of the mastaba. Shaft G 7110A was never used. Shaft G 7110B was originally intended for Hetepheres II, but was never finished and shows no sign of ever being used. This is most likely due to the fact that Hetepheres remarried after the death of her husband. Shaft G 7120A was the burial place of Kawab. A red granite sarcophagus was made for Kawab and found in place. The sarcophagus is inscribed with the following text:
1) "A boon which the king gives and Anubis, foremost of the divine booth, a burial in the necropolis as a possessor of a well provided state before the great god, officiant of Anubis, priest of Selket, Kawab
2) a boon which the king gives and Anubis, foremost of the divine booth, a burial in the necropolis in the western cemetery, having grown gracefully old, the king’s son of his body, Kawab 
3) king’s eldest son of his body, officiant of Anubis, Kawab."

After death 
Several centuries after Kawab died, Prince Khaemweset, son of Ramesses II, restored Kawab's statue in the temple of Memphis.

In popular culture
The film adaptation of David Macaulay's 1975 book Pyramid depicts Kawab as being killed by an ambush near the border between Egypt and Nubia.

Sources

Heirs to the ancient Egyptian throne
Viziers of the Fourth Dynasty of Egypt
Princes of the Fourth Dynasty of Egypt
Khufu
Heirs apparent who never acceded